The National Federation of Building Trades Operatives (NFBTO) was a trade union federation in the United Kingdom, consisting of unions with members in construction and related industries.

History
In 1914, a group of workers attempted to form the Building Workers' Trade Union, a single industrial union to cover the entire construction industry.  The existing unions in the industry opposed this, and held a conference in London in February 1915, to discuss their response.  They decided to set up the National Associated Building Trades Council (NABTC).  This focused on considering what industrial policies would be desirable after World War I was concluded.

The council's members remained autonomous in all matters and were free to leave at will, but it attracted affiliations from most relevant unions:

 Amalgamated Slaters', Tilers' and Roofing Operatives' Society
 Amalgamated Society of Carpenters and Joiners
 Manchester Unity of Operative Bricklayers' Society
 National Association of Builders' Labourers
 National Amalgamated Society of Operative House and Ship Painters and Decorators
 United Builders' Labourers' Union
 United Operative Plumbers and Domestic Engineers Association of Great Britain and Ireland

The council achieved little, and the Carpenters proposed that a more centralised federation be created.  This was agreed by the member unions, and on 5 February 1918, the council was refounded as the NFBTO.  It was governed by a general council, chaired by Alfred Gould, and a secretary, Bill Bradshaw.  It launched a campaign for a shorter working week, which was successful.  In 1924, its members were locked out, the NFBTO coming to a settlement with employers.  The Amalgamated Society of Woodcutting Machinists and National Association of Operative Plasterers resigned from the federation in protest, but both rejoined a few years later.

The federation recognised that in rural areas, most small towns and villages had some building workers, but there were not enough in any particular trade to form a branch of one of the affiliated unions.  It decided to create a Composite Section, to represent these workers directly.  It divided these members into two classes: class A, whose work was not closely aligned with any particular union, and came under the discipline of the federation, and class B, who were aligned with a particular union, were given membership of it, but the federation handled their contributions and the administration of their membership.

The federation remained prominent under two long-term secretaries: Richard Coppock from 1920 to 1961, then Harry Weaver, their long tenures partly as a result of not having to seek re-election.  In 1934, Coppock and the NFBTO were central to forming the International Federation of Building and Wood Workers.  In its later years, the federation also organised summer schools, and published the Builders' Standard tabloid.

The NFBTO was regarded as slow to act and bureaucratic.  General Council members, on hearing of an issue, would report to their union executives and wait to be told how to vote, before returning and making decisions at the following meeting.   In an attempt to tackle this, in 1964 it was renamed the central council, and all executive members of affiliates could attend, in the hope of enabling immediate policy decisions.  Given its unwieldy nature, the council only met four times a year, and an executive committee of seven members made decisions between meetings.  The federation also set up regional councils, each with its own secretary, and in any location where more than one affiliate had a branch, they could chose to also form a branch of the federation.

In 1970, the NFBTO changed its name to the National Federation of Construction Unions, but the following year, several affiliates merged to form the Union of Construction, Allied Trades and Technicians, and the federation decided to dissolve.

Affiliates
The affiliates of the federation in 1965 were:

References

External links
Catalogue of the NFBTO archives, held at the Modern Records Centre, University of Warwick

Trade unions established in 1914
1971 disestablishments
Building and construction trade unions